Adun may refer to:

A molecular dynamics simulation application 
Adun (StarCraft), a fictional Protoss character in StarCraft
An alternative name for the ancient city of Dion, Palestine
Another word for Dúnedain in J. R. R. Tolkien's legendarium